Kazuma Kaneko (金子 一馬, Kaneko Kazuma, born September 20, 1964) is a Japanese video game artist and designer for Japanese video game company Atlus. Kaneko is best known for his work in the Megami Tensei series of video games, acting as a character designer across multiple games. Kaneko is often referred to as the "Demon Artist" due to his artistic ability to represent otherworldly and demonic forms. During his professional career, Kaneko has also done freelance work for videogame companies Capcom and Konami, designing Dante and Vergil's Devil Trigger forms in the video game Devil May Cry 3, as well as designing the characters Inhert and Lloyd in Zone of the Enders: The 2nd Runner.

Early life 
Kaneko was born on September 20, 1964 in the neighborhood of Shimokitazawa, located in Tokyo, Japan. His parents owned a sushi shop where he would occasionally work at and his residence was located close to the property. As an only child, Kaneko spent a lot of time watching television (specifically kaiju shows and films like Kamen Rider) and studying mysterious anomalies, which further expanded into the analysis of religious literature and cultures.

Career 
Kaneko initially started off his professional career as an animator, but due to low pay rates across Japan, he was hesitant to continue. After playing the video game Digital Devil Story: Megami Tensei on the Nintendo Famicom, he was enthralled with how the game had a darker tone compared to other role-playing video games at the time and its interweaving of order and chaos. Kaneko then applied to and joined Atlus in 1988.

One of his first projects was working on the game King of Kings as a character designer. most notably designing the Lucifer demon featured in the game. Kaneko has stated that working on the project is what helped inspired his future designs for the Shin Megami Tensei series.

Whenever Kaneko made professional appearances on television and published interviews, he always wore black clothing with sunglasses to represent his dark personality and his interest in fashion, specifically influenced by the film Saturday Night Fever. He occasionally would be mistaken for a member of the Japanese yakuza.

Later in his career, Kaneko would act as a mentor to newcomer artist Shigenori Soejima, who joined Atlus in 1995 and would later take Kaneko's position as the acting art director for the company.

Artistic process 
Whenever Kaneko designs characters and demons for a game, he takes inspiration from all forms of mythology as well as artifacts left behind from ancient civilizations. Kaneko takes a lot of inspiration from particularly Native American mythology. Kaneko's artistic inspirations include close friend and manga artist Hirohiko Araki and Suehiro Maruo. Kaneko's character designs usually include modern day fashion and motifs that stray away from the standard fantasy trope in RPGs. This artistic decision was made to make the characters feel more relatable to players. Kaneko also considers the personality traits and backstories of characters during the design process which helps him decide on aspects such as the clothes they wear. Kaneko's demon designs take a more serious approach, where there is more focus on the historical context and mythologies of the figures being represented. Kaneko draws his designs on paper first, then transitions to scanning them onto a computer, where coloring and additional details are added. There were cases where Kaneko's designs would receive scrutiny from higher-ups at Nintendo, requesting him to censor certain aspects. At first, Kaneko struggled finding his own unique style and means of expression but eventually was able to solidify his artistic works.

Notable works 
Kaneko has been credited on working on a majority of Atlus' game catalog, as both a character designer and a scenario writer, but his personal favorite project to work on was the PlayStation 2 RPG Shin Megami Tensei III: Nocturne, a game he shares a deep connection with. After presenting the original concept behind Nocturne to Atlus staff, Kaneko acted as the character designer and worked as a co-producer along with Atlus founder Kouji Okada. Nocturne represented a turning point for not only Atlus, but Kaneko's artistic career as a whole.

The Vortex World represented within Nocturne was designed by Kaneko, and ties into the teachings of Gnosticism and cosmology.

Works

References

1964 births
Living people
Persona (series)
Place of birth missing (living people)
Japanese artists
Japanese graphic designers
Japanese company founders
Video game artists